The Lesser Kuril Chain (or 小千島列島), is an island chain in the northwestern Pacific Ocean. The islands are administered as part of Yuzhno-Kurilsky District of Sakhalin Oblast, Russia, and many sources consider the chain to be geographically part of the Kuril Islands. However, the Japanese government claims that these islands are not part of the Kuril Islands and are instead minor islands of Hokkaido Prefecture.

The Lesser Kuril Chain lies northeast of the Nemuro Peninsula in Hokkaido, near the southwestern end of the Greater Kuril Chain, from which it is separated  by the South Kuril Strait. It consists of Shikotan, the Habomai Islands and several small islands lying close to the Shikotan.

The islands of the chain, along with neighbouring Kunashir, have been recognised as Important Bird Areas (IBAs) by BirdLife International because they support populations of various threatened bird species, including many waterbirds, seabirds and waders.

References 

Islands of the Kuril Islands
Important Bird Areas of the Kurile Islands
Seabird colonies